Grange-over-Sands is a railway station on the Furness Line, which runs between  and . It is owned by Network Rail and managed by Northern Trains.

History
The station was opened as Grange on 1 September 1857 by the Ulverstone and Lancaster Railway.

The station was renamed several times, alternating between Grange and Grange-over-Sands, the current name being settled on by the London Midland and Scottish Railway in October 1930.

The station building was designed by the Lancaster architect E. G. Paley for the Furness Railway Company in about 1864. 

Two camping coaches were positioned here by the London Midland Region from 1954 to 1964, and four coaches from 1965 to 1970.

At one time the line carried a very heavy industrial traffic to support the iron and steel industry of the Furness area, including coke from County Durham.

Location
The station is adjacent to the Grange-over-Sands Promenade which runs along the edge of Morecambe Bay (until the River Kent changed its course, it was alongside the promenade - it is now further out in the bay towards Arnside).

Facilities

The station booking office is on the "up" platform and is staffed all week; the "down" platform features a second-hand book-shop named Oversands Bookshop.  There is step-free access to both platforms.  Digital information screens, customer help points and automatic announcements provide train running information.

There is a small car park at the station, and a bus-stop for local services. The X6 bus operated by Stagecoach also travels to Ulverston and Barrow (westbound) and Kendal (eastbound), departing every hour during the day.

The station was awarded 'Heritage Station of the Year' in 2012.

Services

There is normally one train an hour in each direction on weekdays & Saturdays (with peak extras) and an hourly service on Sundays. Since the May 2018 timetable change, there is a Sunday service on the Cumbrian Coast and a handful of through trains operate (three each way - connections are available at Barrow at other times).

See also
 List of non-ecclesiastical works by E. G. Paley

References

External links

 
 

Railway stations in Cumbria
DfT Category E stations
Former Ulverston and Lancaster Railway stations
Railway stations in Great Britain opened in 1857
Northern franchise railway stations
E. G. Paley buildings
1857 establishments in England
Grade II listed buildings in Cumbria
Grange-over-Sands